Union Pacific 4012 is one of eight preserved Union Pacific Big Boy locomotives. Built in November 1941 by the American Locomotive Company (ALCO) of Schenectady, New York, No. 4012 was retired in 1962 and donated to Steamtown, U.S.A, in Bellows Falls, Vermont, and later moved to Steamtown National Historic Site in Scranton, Pennsylvania, where it remains today.

History
Union Pacific 4012, nicknamed "Big Boy", is a 4-8-8-4 type locomotive built by American Locomotive Company in November 1941. It is among the world's largest steam locomotives. One of 25 built, No. 4012 is one of eight of its type to survive the advent of the diesel era. Referred to as an "articulated" locomotive, because it has more than one set of drivers, Big Boy weighs . This locomotive worked for 21 years hauling freight between Cheyenne, Wyoming, and Ogden, Utah, logging over  before its retirement in 1962.

No. 4012 was offered to Steamtown, U.S.A. along with a 4-6-6-4 Challenger and an office car. Steamtown founder F. Nelson Blount, faced with space limitations at Steamtown in 1962, could only accept the 4012. The Big Boy was on display at Bellows Falls, Vermont, until 1984, when Steamtown moved to Scranton, Pennsylvania. Since the Steamtown turntable and roundhouse are too small to accommodate the size and weight of 4012, it has remained outdoors since its arrival at Scranton.

The Steamtown Special History Study recommended that this locomotive remain at Steamtown because it is the only articulated locomotive in the Steamtown U.S.A. collection and recommended that due to its good condition, 4012 could be restored to working order. However, the study also recommended that 4012 remain on static display, because it is doubtful that the "track, switches, culverts, trestles, bridges, wyes, turntables, and other facilities that would have to carry it to bear its great weight".

Beginning on October 2, 2019, No. 4012 was removed from public display to begin a cosmetic restoration, including asbestos removal and repainting. The cosmetic restoration was completed on May 5, 2021, and the locomotive was returned to static display for National Train Day.

References

4-8-8-4 locomotives
4012
ALCO locomotives
Simple articulated locomotives
Railway locomotives introduced in 1941
Individual locomotives of the United States
Standard gauge locomotives of the United States
Preserved steam locomotives of Pennsylvania